The Monument to Rashid Behbudov is a monument to the Azerbaijani singer Rashid Behbudov. It is located in Baku, the capital of Azerbaijan, on Rashid Behbudov Street, in the front of the State Theatre of Song named in Rashid Behbudov's honour. The Azerbaijan National Library is located on the opposite side of Rashid Behbudov Street.

The sculpture is Fuad Salayev, the People's Artist of Azerbaijan. The monument was raised on 11 June 2016. The unveiling took place on 4 October of the same year. The opening ceremony was attended by the President of the Republic of Azerbaijan, Ilham Aliyev.

References

2016 establishments
Monuments and memorials in Baku